Carmen Radu is a former president and CEO of Exim Bank of Romania. Radu took on the role in 2005 and was replaced by Ionut Costea in 2009.  She formally occupied posts in the Ministry of Public Finance and was a director in the institution.

References

Romanian businesspeople
Living people
Romanian women in business
Women chief executives
Year of birth missing (living people)